Huthaifa Al Salemi (Arabic:حذيفة السالمي ) (born 7 February 1994) is a Qatari footballer.

External links
 

Qatari footballers
1994 births
Living people
Al-Gharafa SC players
Muaither SC players
Al Kharaitiyat SC players
Qatar Stars League players
Association football midfielders